Yolboyu can refer to:

 Yolboyu, Çine
 Yolboyu, Oltu